Ernest Jay "Ernie" Janet (born July 22, 1949) is a former American football player, a guard in the National Football League.

Early years
Born in Renton, Washington, Janet attended Glacier High School in Burien, and played college football at the University of Washington in Seattle under head coach Jim Owens. On the Husky offensive line, he played alongside center Bruce Jarvis; in their senior season in 1970, the Huskies improved to 6–4 with sophomore Sonny Sixkiller at quarterback.

NFL career
Janet was selected in the second round of the 1971 NFL Draft (37th overall) by the San Francisco 49ers. He later played three seasons with the Chicago Bears then split the 1975 season between the Philadelphia Eagles and the Green Bay Packers.

See also
List of Philadelphia Eagles players
List of Green Bay Packers players

References

External links
 

1949 births
Sportspeople from Renton, Washington
Chicago Bears players
Philadelphia Eagles players
Green Bay Packers players
American football offensive guards
Washington Huskies football players
Living people